Vítor Hugo may refer to:
 Vítor Hugo (futsal player, born 1982), Portuguese goalkeeper, plays for SC Braga 
 Vítor Hugo (futsal player, born 1984), Portuguese defender, plays for Benfica
 Vítor Hugo (footballer, born 1985), Portuguese striker
 Vítor Hugo (footballer, born 1986), Portuguese striker, played for C.D. Trofense
 Vitor Hugo (footballer, born 1991), Brazilian defender, plays for Trabzonspor
 Vitor Hugo (footballer, born 2003), Brazilian footballer
 Vitor Hugo (footballer, born 2004), Brazilian footballer
 Vítor Hugo da Silva (born 1963), Portuguese roller hockey player

Others with the given names "Vítor Hugo" or similar
 Vitor Hugo dos Santos (born 1996), Brazilian sprinter
 Vítor Hugo Gomes Passos (born 1987), aka Pelé, Portuguese footballer
 Vitor-Hugo Ferreira (born 1965), Portuguese archer
 Vítor Hugo Silva Azevedo (born 1992) aka Vitinha, Portuguese footballer

See also
 Victor Hugo (disambiguation)